Plieux is a commune in the Gers department in southwestern France.

Geography

Locality

Hydrography 
The Auroue flows north through the western part of the commune; the river Arrats forms all of the commune's eastern border.

Population

See also
Communes of the Gers department

References

Communes of Gers